Vladimir Batez (born September 7, 1969) is a Serbian politician and a retired volleyball player who competed for Yugoslavia in the 1996 Summer Olympics and in the 2000 Summer Olympics. He was the Provincial Secretary for Sports and Youth in the Government of Vojvodina from 2016 to 2020, serving under president Igor Mirović.

Early life
He was born in Bijelo Polje, Montenegro, Yugoslavia.

Career
In 1996 he was part of the Yugoslav team which won the bronze medal in the Olympic tournament. He played all eight matches.

Four years later he won the gold medal with the Yugoslav team in the 2000 Olympic tournament. He played five matches.

References

 

1969 births
Living people
Serbian men's volleyball players
Serbia and Montenegro men's volleyball players
Yugoslav men's volleyball players
Volleyball players at the 1996 Summer Olympics
Volleyball players at the 2000 Summer Olympics
Olympic volleyball players of Yugoslavia
Olympic gold medalists for Federal Republic of Yugoslavia
Olympic bronze medalists for Federal Republic of Yugoslavia
Olympic medalists in volleyball
Sportspeople from Novi Sad
Medalists at the 2000 Summer Olympics
Medalists at the 1996 Summer Olympics
Serbian Progressive Party politicians
Government ministers of Vojvodina
Serbian people of Montenegrin descent
Serbian expatriate sportspeople in Italy
Serbian expatriate sportspeople in Belgium
Serbs of Montenegro